Ireland was represented by the female trio Sheeba in the Eurovision Song Contest 1981 with the song "Horoscopes", written by Joe Kelly and Jim Burkett.

Before Eurovision

The National Song Contest 1981

Competing entries 
Sheeba had previously appeared at the National finals in 1978, while member Maxi had performed for Ireland at the 1973 Eurovision finals. They were one of two female trios in the Contest - the other being The Duskey Sisters. Male/female groups were represented by opening act Tara and closing act Karen Black and The Nevada - the latter being a famous recording act in Ireland at the time under the line up of Roy Taylor, Karen Black and The Nevada. Their song "My Pet Parrot" was largely a novelty song (featuring a man dressed as a Parrot playing trombone (whom Black later claimed was drunk during the performance) and became heavily played on Irish radio. Tony Kenny was also a famous artist in Ireland at the time and had released many hit singles, as well as performing a number of times in the National finals. Nicola Kerr was known at the time for being a member of the current line-up of UK pop group (and former Eurovision entrants) The New Seekers. The remaining two contestants were also solo females, Helen Jordan and Sylvia McFadden (who received 'nul points' with her own composition).

Sheeba would later take part in the 1982 National Song Contest, where they came 7th. Two other artists competing this year entered also: Tony Kenny, who came 6th and The Duskey Sisters (as The Duskeys) who won.

Final 
The final was held on 1 March 1981 at the RTE TV Studios in Dublin, hosted by Mike Murphy. The winner was chosen by 10 regional juries. Killarney was due to announce their votes after Dublin, but due to connection problems, they had to announce their votes last.

The show's result was a surprise as "My Pet Parrot" had been touted as the favourite to win before the Contest. The contest closed with all the Contestants performing Barry Manilow's "I Write The Songs" on stage as the credits rolled.

At Eurovision 
The song is an up-tempo number, with the girls singing about the fascination some people have with horoscopes and star signs. They explain that this is "crazy, crazy", because "it's we, not the stars above, who write our horoscopes". They tell their listeners that they have to work hard to achieve their goals in life instead of waiting and doing nothing ("success comes from what we do, not from what we're told"). The three singers wore revealing green dresses during the performance.

The Eurovision final in 1981 was held at the RDS in Dublin, Ireland. It was presented by Doireann Ní Bhriain. Sheeba were the 12th act to perform.

Sheeba finished fifth in the Eurovision Song Contest final on April 4. They received two maximums of 12 points during the voting. The overall winner was United Kingdom.

The song "Horoscopes" became a No. 3 hit in the Irish charts.

Voting

References 

1981
Countries in the Eurovision Song Contest 1981
Eurovision
Eurovision
1981 songs